Launi Skinner (born 1964) is a Canadian business woman, with 20 years of experience leading several high-profile companies within Canada and internationally, including Starbucks US, 1-800-GOT-JUNK?, and First West Credit Union. Skinner is currently chief executive officer of First West Credit Union, one of Canada's largest credit unions.

Skinner joined First West Credit Union in 2010, four months after the January 1, 2010, merger of Valley First Credit Union and Envision Credit Union. The same year, Skinner established First West Capital, a wholly owned subsidiary that provides subordinated debt and mezzanine finance services to small and medium-sized businesses in British Columbia. Under Skinner's leadership in 2013, First West Credit Union successfully acquired Enderby & District Credit Union. Then, under Skinner's leadership In 2015, Vancouver Island-based Island Savings Credit Union merged with First West Credit Union.

Career

Before joining First West Credit Union, Skinner served as chief operating officer of 1-800 GOT JUNK? and as president of Starbucks US. However, during her first year at First West, Skinner grew the credit union's net interest income by 37.3% to $129.0 million. Skinner's leadership between 2010 and 2016 saw First West introducing more than 20 new products and services, donating more than $2.2 million to charitable community causes, increasing total assets to $8.7 billion and adding more than 35,000 net new members, the latter a particularly noteworthy accomplishment in light of the flat membership growth trends facing Canada's credit union industry at the time.

Professional recognition 

Skinner is a four-time recipient of the Women's Executive Network's (WXN) Canada's Most Powerful Women: Top 100 Award, having received the accolade in 2010, 2011, 2012, and 2014, earning her entrance into WXN's Hall of Fame. She was also recognized by Business in Vancouver as one of the Most Influential Women in Business in 2011. In 2007, Skinner was included as one of the "Four Women to Watch" in Fortune Magazine’s 50 Most Power Women feature. Internationally, Skinner received the 2011 Stevie Award for Best Canadian Executive.

Skinner has contributed to a number of boards and community organizations. She is a strong advocate for women in business and is deeply involved in the community. She served as past-chair for the Metro Vancouver YWCA Women of Distinction Awards in 2010 and 2011. Skinner is also a community leader for the Minerva Foundation for BC Women. Additionally, she is a board member for Rocky Mountaineer, and Science World. Skinner is a former member of the board of governors for Kwantlen Polytechnic University. and former board member of Qtrade Financial Group.

Notes

Businesspeople from British Columbia
Canadian women in business
Living people
1964 births